Jordan of Osnabrück (c. 1220 – 15 April 1284) was a significant German political writer of the 13th century. He is known for his work De praerogativa Romani imperii. Antony Black writes: "In the tracts written between c. 1250 and c. 1281 by Jordan of Osnabrück and Alexander of Roes [...] it was claimed that divine dispensation had allotted the empire to Germans via Charlemagne."

He died at Osnabrück.

Notes

External links

1284 deaths
Year of birth uncertain
Writers from Osnabrück
1220s births